Kelvyn Glen Alp (born 27 March 1971) is a New Zealand far-right politician and activist. During the 1990s, Alp established a paramilitary organisation called the New Zealand Armed Intervention Force. During the 2020s, Alp founded a far-right media platform called Counterspin Media, which played an active role in leading the 2022 Wellington protest.

Paramilitary activism
In 1996 Alp set up the New Zealand Armed Intervention Force as a mercenary organisation, later transforming it into a para-military, anti-banking, pro-people rights movement – although it was referred to in the media as a Māori separatist organisation. It is now defunct.

Alp claimed to have used a "Māori Passport" to travel to the Solomon Islands in 2001. Alp has claimed that this practice ended after the New Zealand Labour-led government threatened to pull aid from the Solomon Islands.

Political career
Alp was the leader of the Direct Democracy Party of New Zealand which stood in the 2005 general elections. He also stood for Mayor of Manukau City in 2007. Alp stood in the 2011 Te Tai Tokerau by-election under the OurNZ Party banner receiving 0.5% of the vote.

Counterspin Media
Alp is a director of and programme host for far right media platform Counterspin Media Limited. Counterspin streams on the Steve Bannon-led GTV network, whose content has been described as "a significant source of fake news and misinformation". A Counterspin contributor interrupted a press conference by New Zealand Prime Minister Jacinda Ardern in November 2021, loudly shouting misinformation about COVID-19 vaccines, leading Ardern to temporarily halt the event.

Alp was an agitating force at the Convoy 2022 New Zealand protest between February and March 2022, calling for the protestors to storm parliament and arrest MPs.

In mid-August 2022, Alp and fellow Counterspin Media host Hannah Spierer featured in Stuff's Circuit documentary Fire and Fury, which examined various anti-vaccination and far right figures and groups involved in the 2022 Wellington protest. The documentary's producers including journalist Paula Penfold did not interview Alp and Spierer on the grounds that they did not want to give them a plaform but instead used their videos, social media posts, and media coverage relating to their activities. In response, broadcaster Sean Plunket hosted Alp on his online radio station 
The Platform to share his side of the story regarding Fire and Fury.

Legal problems
On 25 August 2022,  Alp and Spierer were arrested in Christchurch on charges of distributing an objectionable publication, and for failing to allow Police to search their computer. The pair had allegedly distributed footage of the 2019 Christchurch mosque shootings on Counterspin Media. The pair were subsequently bailed and ordered to appear at the Christchurch District Court on 30 August. During the hearing on 31 August, the pair refused to enter the dock and instead read prepared statements from the lawyer's bench. After ignoring Judge Large's repeated instructions to stand in the dock, Alp and Spierer were forcibly removed by security personnel and remanded on bail for three weeks. 60 pro-Counterspin demonstrators and a smaller group of counter-demonstrators demonstrated outside the Christchurch District Court. 

The pair subsequently reappeared at the Christchurch District Court in December 2022. In addition to the charge of sharing the objectionable documentary of the Christchurch mosque shooting, Alp was charged with "failing to carry out obligations in relation to a computer search."

References

1971 births
Living people
Direct democracy activists
New Zealand Army personnel
New Zealand mercenaries
Māori activists
Direct Democracy Party of New Zealand politicians
Leaders of political parties in New Zealand
Unsuccessful candidates in the 1999 New Zealand general election
Unsuccessful candidates in the 2005 New Zealand general election
Far-right politics in New Zealand